Willie Hurst (born March 14, 1980) is a former American player of Canadian football for the B.C. Lions.

High school
Hurst was a standout high school football player at Dominguez, earning All-CIF honors as a senior and received six votes in the Long Beach Press Telegram's "Best in the West" voting. Hurst also played point guard for the basketball team.

College career
Hurst played at the University of Washington from 1998 to 2001.

Professional career
Hurst played for the B.C. Lions of the CFL, rushing for 164 yards on 17 carries in his debut.

After football
Hurst is a coach at Lakeside.

See also
 Washington Huskies football statistical leaders

References

External links
 Profile at Sports Reference
 Washington Huskies profile

1980 births
Living people
American football running backs
Washington Huskies football players
BC Lions players
Players of American football from Compton, California